The Jacob Hoffstetter House is a former single-family home located at 322 East Washington Street in Ann Arbor, Michigan. It was listed on the National Register of Historic Places in 1982.

History
Jacob Hoffstetter arrived in Ann Arbor in 1854 at the age of five with his parents, Christian and Mary Hoffstetter; one of a large number of German immigrants who arrived in the area in the 1840s and 1850s. In 1872, Jacob Hoffstetter established a saloon and grocery on Main Street. Jacob, his wife, and his family lived above the store for some time. The business proved prosperous, and in about 1887 Hoffstetter sold the business and used the proceeds to construct this house. The home was large, and the Hoffstetters took on boarders. These included the men of the University of Michigan chapter of the Alpha Tau Omega fraternity, who boarded with the Hoffstetters from 1888 when the chapter was founded until 1894.

In 1937 the house was divided into apartments, and a new entrance constructed at the southeast corner. The building was rehabilitated again in 1980 for commercial and residential use.

Description
The Jacob Hoffstetter House is a large two-story, red brick, gabled Late Victorian structure sitting on a coursed ashlar foundation. The windows are narrow, single-light-sash, double-hung units with stone sills and segmental-arch heads. At the lintel level in each story, a two-brick high belt course of yellow brick encircles the building. Bay windows and the two side porches are topped with cornices.

The 1937 renovation substantially altered the interior, but much of the original wood trim was kept and new trim was selected to be consistent with the old.

References

		
National Register of Historic Places in Washtenaw County, Michigan
Victorian architecture in Michigan
Houses completed in 1887
Houses in Ann Arbor, Michigan